The 2000 Citrix Tennis Championships was an ATP men's tennis tournament held in Delray Beach, Florida, USA and was part of the International Series of the 2000 ATP Tour. The tournament was held from February 28 to March 6, 2000. Sixth-seeded Stefan Koubek won the singles title.

Finals

Singles

 Stefan Koubek defeated  Álex Calatrava 6–1, 4–6, 6–4
 It was Koubek's only singles title of the year and the 2nd of his career.

Doubles

 Brian MacPhie /  Nenad Zimonjić defeated  Joshua Eagle /  Andrew Florent 7–5, 6–4
 It was MacPhie's only title of the year and the 2nd of his career. It was Zimonjić's 2nd title of the year and the 3rd of his career.

References

External links
 
 ATP tournament profile
 ITF tournament edition details

Citrix Tennis Championships
Citrix Tennis Championships
Citrix Tennis Championships
Citrix Tennis Championships
Citrix Tennis Championships
Delray Beach Open
2000 Citrix Tennis Championships